Kotla is the name of a valley in Northern Bagh the name of the main village of this valley is Kotla,on the basis of which the entire valley was named Kotla Valley. Kotla is a Village and tourist resort in Bagh District, Azad Kashmir, Pakistan. Kotla contains pine trees that are hundreds of years old. It takes approximately 1 hour to drive from Bagh to Kotla.

History

Kotla Valley is a historical site in Bagh District. It is said that at one time a family named Sakal lived here.The family migrated 300 years ago today due to heavy snowfall. At that time there was heavy snowfall in Bagh Valley. And until the month of August, the ice was frozen in the streams. Kotla and Bagh had dense forests. Even today, in the form of Khanthi forest, the largest forest in the Bagh Valley is located near Kotla. Traces of old times have been found in Kotla. The Sakal family cemetery is also located at Lad.

Forests
Kotla is also home to some of the rarest forests in the region containing Pine Abies pindrow trees that are hundreds of years old. Due to lack of knowledge/interest, these forests are now endangered to become extinct as locals continue deforestation by cutting down trees yet local/state governments seem to have no interest in saving them.

Geography
The village is situated on the confluence of two mini nullahs, Jaber Nala and Mangimar, which flow all the year round. Kotla is 18 km from the city of Bagh and is located in a valley surrounded by large mountains on three sides. On the south of the valley lies Kanthi Forest. The northern area of Kotla borders Muzaffarabad District. Kotla is the central point of the Sharqi area.

Tourism

Kotla Waterfalls
Kotla Watterfalls is located in Kotla village. It is a very large waterfall. It is located at a height of 5798 feet above sea level. The Valley of the Bagh is located at a height of 5798 feet above sea level.

The stream, on reaching the verge of the rocky walls of the valley, forms a cascade so high that it is almost lost in spray before it reaches the level of the valley. After rain, and early in the season when fed by the melting snows, Kotla Falls is very striking. The force of the stream above the fall at such times is sufficient to carry the water clear of the precipice, and the whole mass descends in a condition of liquid dust, between spray and cloud, that sways to and fro with the gentlest breeze. In a dry summer, when the supply of water is much reduced, the effect is comparatively insignificant. The height of the cascade is between 300 and 400 ft, one of the highest in Kashmir formed of a single unbroken fall.

Danna Medows
Danna is a hilltop area situated in Tehsil Bagh in the Bagh District of Azad Kashmir. Rawalakot, Muzaffarabad, Kazinag Glacier (14,500 ft) and Jhulem River can be viewed from Danna.
Danna is the highest mountainous location in the northeastern area of Bagh, and near Kotla. it is the point of origin of three different mountain ridges. There are some remains of an old mazar on the highest hilltop.
Danna is most accessible during the summer months; the weather is generally pleasant but becomes colder from October through March.

Danni Sar (Lake)
Danni Sar is a high-altitude lake ( located near Kotla Bagh, Azad Kashmir.

Pir Kanthi
Pīr Kanthi is a peak and is located in near Kotla village. The elevation above sea level is 3321 metres.

Ganga Choti

Ganga Peak, more commonly known as Ganga Choti among locals, is located in the Bagh district of Azad Kashmir. It is also visible from Bagh city and is often called "the Crown of Bagh". Ganga Choti is approachable from Sudhan Gali and Kotla, Dist Bagh, it is four hours trek and it is strenuous trek since you have to gain height at every step as there is very scant flat ground on this trek. Ganga Choti is a peak village Bani Minhasan and Kotla in Bagh District, Azad Kashmir, Pakistan. It is an attraction for tourists in that area. It is situated in the Pir Panjal Range.

The hike for Ganga peak starts from the town of Sudhan Gali and Kotla which is at a height of 2200 meters above sea level. From there, the peak can be reached through a 3–4 hours easy hike. People in Chanari climb Ganga from that side.

The hike to Ganga offers views of the valley and meadows. From the peak, there is a 360-degree panoramic view of the whole area. The nearest peak higher from Ganga Peak is called Pir Kanthi, which is at an aerial distance of about 10 km from it.

Ganga Lake
Ganga Lake or Ganga Sar is a high-altitude lake  located in the Bagh Valley, Azad Kashmir, Pakistan. It is near Ganga Choti Peak in the Himalayan (Pir Panjal) range. The lake is accessible from Bagh by a Jeep track.

Peaks
There are nine peaks around the Kotla Valley.

Culture
The culture of Kotla Village Azad Kashmir has many similarities to that of the northern Punjabi (Potohar) culture in Punjab province, The Peshawari turban is worn by some. The traditional dress of the women is the shalwar kameez in Pahari style.

Maldiyal Mughal in Kotla (Tribes living in Kotla) 

For several hundred years, Kotla was inhabited only by the Maldial Mughal tribe. Later, a non-Muslim was settled on land after converting to Islam. The family whose descendants live in Kotla is called Sheikh. Everyone here speaks a Phari language.

Maldiyal Mughal 
The Maldiyal is a Mughal clan, living in Azad Kashmir and Rawalpindi division of Punjab, Pakistan and Jammu and Kashmir division, and Punjab regions of India. It is a major land-holding tribe in Bagh District and Tehsil Abbaspur of the Poonch District and Tehsil Mendhar of District Poonch of Indian Jammu and Kashmir. The main village of Maldiyal is birpani, Kotla, Topi Kothian & Narr Sher Ali Khan, moere than 95% population of these areas is Maldiyal The word "Maldyal" is derived from the name of Mirza Moloud Baig, Father of Maldyals and a great warrior of Poonch State.
 Shajra of Mirza Moloud Baig

A short introduction from Ameer Taimoor Gorgani Barlasi. The great Mughal Emperor to Mirza Moloud Baig.

Ameer Taimoor Gorgania Barlasi, the great Mughal Emperor

 Ameerzada Umer Sheikh Gorgani
 Mirza Baiqra
 Ghiaath-Ud-Din Mansoor Mirza
 Ghazi Hussain Mirza
 Badih-Uz-Zaman Mirza
 Muhammad Yaadgar Mirza
 Mirza Tahir Baig
 Mirza Mouloud Baig

The tribe has a history of bravery and martiality. The tribe is descended from Prince Mirza Tahir Baig, who immigrated from Herat in Afghanistan, which was the largest province of Taimoorid Sultanate, and settled in Srinagar. Later, the Maldyal Tribe settled in Poonch.

Climate 
Kotla features a subtropical highland climate (Cwa) under the Köppen climate classification due to high altitude. Kotla has mild to warm temperatures during the spring and autumn, humid temperatures during summer and cold to snowy during the winter. The temperature can rise as high as  during the mid-summer months and drop below  during the winter months. Snowfall can occur in December and January, while most rainfall occurs during the monsoon season stretching from July to September.

Sports

There is a cricket ground near the Dana Medows known as Goralay Bagly Ground, located between two mountains. Every year in June a cricket tournament is held there in which sixteen teams of District Bagh and Mzd participate.

Earthquake of 2005
Kotla and its surrounding villages were totally destroyed by the 2005 Kashmir earthquake, hundreds of people were killed or injured by this quake. 100% population was left homeless. Most of the houses have been reconstructed though with the help of the Governments of Pakistan, Azad Kashmir and local and international NGOs.

References

Populated places in Bagh District